Keine Macht für Niemand (“No power for nobody”) is the name of both the second album and best-known song by the German rock band Ton Steine Scherben.  The double album, released in 1972, is also sometimes called “die Weiße” (“the white one”) in reference to its simple cover with a white background and black text.

The album as a whole, as well as the song Keine Macht für Niemand heavily criticised social and political ills.  The lyrics call for resistance against the extant system.  In Die letzte Schlacht gewinnen wir (“We will win the final battle”), the demand for a replacement of the present capitalist system is very clear.  The phrase “No power for nobody” is a sloganised interpretation of anarchy.  When the album was released, Rio Reiser and  had still yet to adopt their stage names.

Use as a slogan 
According to Rio Reiser, the phrase came from an anarchist publication called Germania.  Similarly, the song Macht kaputt, was euch kaputt macht also has a title in the same vein.  In Germany, even 35 years after the album's release, the phrase will appear on banners and posters produced in the leftist scene, or as graffiti; the song's lyrics call to “write the slogan onto every wall.”

Title 
Wir müssen hier raus! (Ralph Möbius, Ralph Steitz) – 5:21
Feierabend (Möbius, Steitz) – 4:41
Die letzte Schlacht gewinnen wir (Möbius, Steitz) – 4:18
Paul Panzers Blues (Nikel Pallat, Möbius) – 6:41
Menschenjäger (Möbius, Steitz) – 4:18
Allein machen sie Dich ein (Möbius, Steitz) – 4:41
Schritt für Schritt ins Paradies (Möbius, Steitz) – 6:52
Der Traum ist aus (Möbius) – 9:24
Mensch Meier (Möbius, Steitz) – 3:43
Rauch-Haus-Song (Möbius) – 3:59
Keine Macht für Niemand (Möbius, Steitz) – 4:08
Komm schlaf bei mir (Möbius) – 4:02

Lineup 
Ralph Möbius – vocals, guitar, piano, clavinet
Ralph Steitz – guitar, drums, backup vocals
Kai Sichtermann – bass guitar, banjo, backup vocals
Nikel Pallat – vocals, backup vocals
Jörg Schlotterer – flute, backup vocals
Angie Olbrich – backup vocals
Anna Schimany – backup vocals
Olaf Lietzau – drums
Jochen Petersen – saxophone
Klaus Schulz – cowbell
Eva Zeltner & Rauch-Haus-Chor – backup vocals
Gaby Borowski & Rauch-Haus-Chor – backup vocals
Klaus Freudigmann – sound engineer
Richard Borowski – sound engineer
Hendrick Knoch – additional sound engineer
Gert Möbius – cover design

Reception 

The album is considered a classic in Germany.

Musikexpress ranked Keine Macht für Niemand number 3 in its list of the 100 best German albums of all time.

The German band Kraftklub named their album Keine Nacht für Niemand (“No night for nobody”) after it.

References

Literature 
 Hartmut El Kurdi: Schwarzrote Pop-Perlen. Band 2 der Reihe The Essence of Rock. Laatzen: Wehrhahn, 2001.

External links 
 Alle Texte des Albums Keine Macht für Niemand
 Zum Einfluss der Parole Keine Macht für Niemand

1972 albums
Ton Steine Scherben albums
German-language albums
Political music albums by German artists
Pages translated from German Wikipedia